The Cernabora (also: Scăiuș) is a left tributary of the Timiș in Romania. It flows into the Timiș near the city Lugoj.

References

Rivers of Romania
Rivers of Caraș-Severin County
Rivers of Timiș County